Thala ogasawarana is a species of sea snail, a marine gastropod mollusk, in the family Costellariidae, the ribbed miters.

Distribution
This species occurs in the following locations:
 Ogasawara Islands
 Wakayama Prefecture

References

Costellariidae